Mario Roberto Chirinos Acosta (born 29 July 1978) is a Honduran former footballer who played as a midfielder. He competed in the men's tournament at the 2000 Summer Olympics.

References

External links
 

1978 births
Living people
Sportspeople from Tegucigalpa
Honduran footballers
Association football midfielders
Honduras international footballers
Olympic footballers of Honduras
Footballers at the 2000 Summer Olympics
Liga Nacional de Fútbol Profesional de Honduras players
F.C. Motagua players
Real C.D. España players
Pan American Games silver medalists for Honduras
Footballers at the 1999 Pan American Games
Medalists at the 1999 Pan American Games
Pan American Games medalists in football